This is the discography for French electronic music ensemble Gotan Project.

Studio albums

Remix albums

Live albums

Compilation albums

Singles

Extended plays

Video albums

References 

Discographies of French artists
Electronic music discographies